Altmorschen is a village in the municipality of Morschen, Schwalm-Eder-Kreis in the German State of Hesse.

Villages in Hesse